Knollys is an English surname and variants include Knolles, Knoll, Knowles, and Knowle.

Surname
 Charles Knollys/Knowles (disambiguation)
 David Knollys, 3rd Viscount Knollys (born 1931), British peer, lawyer and politician (Conservative Party)
 Edward Eardley Knollys (1902–91), British artist
 Elizabeth Knollys, Lady Leighton (1549–c.1605), English courtier under Elizabeth I
 Francis Knollys (disambiguation)
 Hanserd Knollys (1599–1691), English particular Baptist minister
 Henry Knollys (disambiguation)
 Lettice Knollys (1543–1634), British noblewoman
 Louis Frederic Knollys (1847–1902), British colonial police chief in Ceylon and Jamaica
 Richard Knollys (c.1548–96), English MP
 Robert Knollys (disambiguation)
 Sir Thomas Knollys (d.1435), English businessman
 William Knollys (disambiguation)

See also
 Knollys family
 Knollys (disambiguation)
 Baron Knollys, subsidiary title to the Earl of Banbury created in the Peerage of England
 Viscount Knollys, title created in the Peerage of the United Kingdom
 Knollys baronets, two Baronetcies created in the Baronetage of Great Britain
 Knowles (disambiguation)
 Knowles (surname)

Surnames